The Dr. Ezekiel R. Dumke College of Health Professions is a college of Weber State University located in the Marriott Allied Health building on the east side of campus south of the Science Lab building.

Degrees awarded in the college are as follows: Dental Hygiene, Emergency Care EMT/Paramedic, Health Administrative Services, Master of Health Administration, Health Care Coding, Health Information Management, Health Sciences, Nursing, Medical Laboratory Scientist, Master of Nursing, Radiology, and Respiratory Therapy.

External links 
College of Health Professions 

Weber State University
University subdivisions in Utah